George Katwesigye was an Anglican bishop in Uganda: he served as the Bishop of Kigezi until 2014.

References

21st-century Anglican bishops in Uganda
Anglican bishops of Kigezi
Uganda Christian University alumni